(born 1963) is a Japanese anime producer notable for working on several of the Sailor Moon animated series.

Anime involved in
Air movie: Producer
Goldfish Warning!: Producer
Legendary Gambler Tetsuya: Producer
Candy Candy (1992 movie): Planning
Make-Up! Sailor Senshi: Planning
Sailor Moon R Movie: Promise of the Rose: Planning
Sailor Moon S: Producer
Sailor Moon S Movie: Hearts in Ice: Planning
Sailor Moon (1990s Anime series): Producer
Cutie Honey Flash: Producer
Anime Shūkan DX! Mi-Pha-Pu: Producer
Phantom Thief Jeanne: Producer

References

Japanese anime producers
Japanese animated film producers
Japanese television producers
Living people
1963 births